Jhund is a 2022 Indian Hindi-language biographical sports film based on the life of Vijay Barse, the founder of NGO Slum Soccer. It is produced by Bhushan Kumar, Krishan Kumar, Sandip Singh, Raaj Hiremath, Savita Hiremath, Nagraj Manjule, Gargee Kulkarni and Meenu Arora under the banner of T-Series, Tandav Films Entertainment Pvt.Ltd and Aatpat Films. The filming began in December 2018 at Nagpur. The film starring Amitabh Bachchan, Akash Thosar, Rinku Rajguru and Ankush Gedam, is written and directed by Nagraj Manjule.

The film was released in theatres on 4 March and 6 May 2022 on ZEE5, However Sony Max premiered on June 26, 2022

Premise 
Based on the life of Vijay Barse, the film is about a sports teacher, who, on the edge of retirement, makes a football team of children from a slum area, and how it changes their life.

Cast 
 Amitabh Bachchan as Vijay Borade
 Ankush Gedam as Ankush Masram aka Don
 Akash Thosar as Sambhya
 Rinku Rajguru as Monica
 Sayli Patil as Bhavana
 Somnath Awaghade as Imran
 Rajiya Suhel as Rajiya
 Angel Anthony as Angel
 Karthik Uikey as Kartik
 Priyanshu Thakur as Babu Chitre
 Jaspreet Singh Randhawa as Aman
 Tanaji Galgunde as Saajan
 Arbaj Shaikh as Raju
 Kiran Thoke as OK
 Chhaya Kadam as Ranjana Borade, Vijay Borade's Wife
 Arjun Radhakrishnan as Arjun Borade, Vijay's son
 Nagraj Manjule as Hitler Bhai
 Kishor Kadam as College Football Team Coach
 Bharat Ganeshpure as Local MLA
 Ramdas Phutane as Principal
 Vitthal Kale as "Scorer"

Production 
The filming of Jhund began in December 2018 at Nagpur. The story of the film is based on the life of Vijay Barse, founder of Slum Soccers. Bachchan plays a professor who motivates the street children to form a football team.
This is Akash, Rinku, and Nagraj's second collaboration after their 2016 Marathi film Sairat. The film was wrapped up on 31 August 2019.

Release 
The film was scheduled for release on 20 September 2019, the date was tweeted by film critic and trade analyst Taran Adarsh. It was later postponed to 13 December 2019. On 21 January 2020, the film release date was announced to be 8 May 2020. The film was further postponed due to the COVID-19 pandemic. In October 2020, the film's released was put on hold while filmmakers work to resolve copyright issues in the courts. The film was released on 4 March 2022.

Home media 
The film became available for streaming on ZEE5 on 6 May 2022, However 26 June 2022 World TV has been released and it has been acquired by Sony Max .

Reception 
The film received highly positive reviews from critics praising the performances of ensemble cast, first half, humour, social message and visuals while criticized the pace in latter half. Saibal Chatterjee of NDTV gave the film a rating of 4.5/5 and wrote "It upends the Bollywood sports biopic template and uses the game of football and an altered narrative form to craft an incisive and deeply felt commentary on the reality of the systemic oppression". ChaRevathi Krishnan of The Print gave the film a rating of 4.5/5 and wrote "Everyone should watch Jhund and question inner prejudices, what is talent, 'merit' and access. It evokes laughter and makes you cry as well". Taran Adarsh of Bollywood Hungama gave the film a rating of 4/5 and wrote "With writing, direction and performance being its major strengths, JHUND makes for a superb entertainer". Stutee Ghosh of The Quint gave the film a rating of 4/5 and wrote "Jhund is special for its determined eagerness to not please and to not treat Bachchan as the star. The veteran actor radiates warmth and a deep sense of humanity, making no concessions to commercial filmmaking". Sanjana Jadhav of Pinkvilla gave the film a rating of 4/5 and wrote "The film keeps you invested in this team's journey through its heartbreaking climax, Manjule's social commentary, great acting and tugs right at your heart with its emotions".

Rachana Dubey of The Times Of India gave the film a rating of 3.5/5 and wrote " There is a smattering of some colourful characters in the first half which adds to the energy and even includes humour.The pre-interval is high on energy but the pace slackens in the latter half". Tushar Joshi of India Today gave the film a rating of 3.5/5 and wrote "Jhund is a rock-solid effort by director Nagraj Manjule, with Amitabh Bachchan towering over it all". Roktim Rajpal of Deccan Herald gave the film a rating of 3.5/5 and wrote "Jhund has no scope for commercial elements like item songs and romance. The makers, fortunately, don't force these aspects into the narrative". Sukanya Verna of Rediff gave the film a rating of 3.5/5 and wrote "Hands in pocket, eyes firmly focused on his mission, conviction inks his speech while his serene, sensitive, portrayal has a calming effect on the kids and Jhund". Shantanu Ray Chaudhuri of The Free Press Journal gave the film a rating of 3.5/5 and wrote "One of the pleasures of the film is its unconventional structure – a heady, almost wilfully haphazard first half, followed by a leisurely paced and painstakingly detailed second one".

The Hans India gave the film a rating of 3/5 and wrote "On the whole, the movie is worth watching as Amitabh Bachchan aka Vijay delivered his best and trains the slum boys with all his dedication!". Mayank Shekhar of Mid-Day gave the film a rating of 3/5. Shubhra Gupta of Indian Express gave the film a rating of 2/5 and wrote "This Nagraj Manjule film can never quite make up its mind whether it wants to treat Amitabh Bachchan's Borade as a hero, or focus the spotlight on the hardscrabble lives of the slum kids". Anna MM Vetticad of Firstpost gave the film a rating of 2/5 and wrote "Jhund, despite its grand ambitions and good intentions, it fails to click as a cohesive, gripping whole".

In the trailer of the movie Jhund, there is a photo frame of Dr. Babasaheb Ambedkar which is being discussed on social media. Along with B. R. Ambedkar, Shivaji Maharaj, Shahu Maharaj and Mahatma Phule are also in this frame. Director Nagraj Manjule said in an interview about the Jhund, "The Jhund is the story of a group which is far from easy opportunities. It's a group that is on the path to success or far from where the opportunity arises. It's a group that is self-defeating, and that's the thing about it."

Soundtrack 

The music of the film is composed by Ajay–Atul with lyrics  written by Amitabh Bhattacharya and Ajay–Atul (noted).

Box office
In the end, the film stopped running with a collection of ₹29 crores.

References

External links 
 
 Jhund on  ZEE5
 Jhund on Bollywood Hungama

2020s Hindi-language films
Indian biographical films
T-Series (company) films
Indian sports films